Disparocypha is a genus of jewel damselfly in the family Chlorocyphidae. There is one described species in Disparocypha, D. biedermanni.

References

Further reading

 
 
 

Chlorocyphidae
Articles created by Qbugbot